Eric Pringle (5 April 1935, Morpeth, Northumberland, England – 13 April 2017, Ledbury, Herefordshire) was a British writer for radio and television. He also wrote three novels for children.

He was one of the writers of the 1972 television series Pretenders, and of the 1974 series The Carnforth Practice.

In 1975, he was commissioned by then-Doctor Who script editor Robert Holmes to pen a two-part serial entitled The Angurth for the programme's thirteenth season. This was eventually abandoned, but in 1981, Pringle was encouraged by his agent, former Who producer Peter Bryant, to submit new material for the show. Pringle delivered two proposals for four-part stories to the production office in August, one called The Darkness (possibly featuring the Daleks) and another entitled War Game. Script editor Eric Saward finally responded to Pringle, and in 1982, Pringle was asked to put together a scene breakdown for War Game.

By 1983, War Game had been rechristened The Awakening (and may also have been called Poltergeist at some point). Saward and producer John Nathan-Turner had also come to the realisation that the story did not merit four episodes, and so Pringle was asked to condense it down to fit the two-part slot for Season Twenty-One. Pringle concurred and performed the necessary rewrites by April.  Saward was still not satisfied with Pringle's modifications; consequently, he elected to heavily rewrite The Awakening. Pringle was not particularly pleased with Saward's rewrites, believing they made the story confusing and rushed. The Awakening would be his only contribution to Doctor Who. 

Much of Pringle's more recent work has been for the radio including adaptations of The Wolves of Willoughby Chase and J. B. Priestley's The Good Companions. His 2001 BBC Radio 4 play Hymus Paradisi about the life of composer Herbert Howells won a Sony Award. That year also saw the publication of his children's novel Big George. This has been followed by two sequels Big George and the Seventh Knight and Big George and the Winter King. The Big George books are a retelling of the Saint George and the Dragon myth with a science fiction twist.

References

External links
 
Eric Pringle radio plays

British children's writers
British television writers
People from Morpeth, Northumberland
Writers from Northumberland
1935 births
2017 deaths